Chilhowie  is a town in Smyth County, Virginia, United States, on the Middle Fork of the Holston River. The population was 1,781 at the 2010 census. The name Chilhowie is said to come from a Cherokee word meaning "valley of many deer". It is also notable for having only one traffic light in the entire city.

Geography
According to the United States Census Bureau, the town has a total area of 2.6 square miles (6.7 km), all of it land.

History 
Chilhowie was often the starting point of longhunter expeditions in the 1700s. In 1748 the area was visited by Colonel James Patton and Dr. Thomas Walker. They constructed a small fort, likely just a blockhouse. An early settler was Samuel Stalnaker (1715-1769) who converted Patton's fort into a tavern known as the Town House, and lived there until the late 1760s. The town sustained severe damage from an EF-2 tornado during the 2011 Super Outbreak.

A.C. Beatie House, H.L. Bonham House, Chilhowie Methodist Episcopal Church, and the Downtown Chilhowie Historic District are listed on the National Register of Historic Places.

Demographics

As of the 2000 census, there were 1,827 people, 708 households, and 462 families living in the town. The population density was 704.6 people per square mile (272.4/km). There were 775 housing units at an average density of 298.9 per square mile (115.5/km). The racial makeup of the town was 94.47% White, 3.07% African American, 0.33% Native American, 0.05% Asian, 1.48% from other races, and 0.60% from two or more races. Hispanic or Latino of any race were 2.13% of the population.

Out of a total of 708 households, 24.7% had children under the age of 18 living with them, 49.2% were married couples living together, 11.4% had a female householder with no husband present, and 34.7% were non-families. 31.5% of households were made up of individuals, and 15.4% were one person aged 65 or older. The average household size was 2.22 and the average family size was 2.76.

The age distribution was 17.2% under the age of 18, 5.4% from 18 to 24, 24.2% from 25 to 44, 24.4% from 45 to 64, and 28.8% 65 or older. The median age was 47 years. For every 100 females, there were 78.9 males. For every 100 females age 18 and over, there were 76.0 males.

The median household income was US$28,266, and the median family income  was US$34,375. Males had a median income of US$24,306 compared with US$18,080 for females. The per capita income for the town was US$16,657. About 10.3% of families and 13.4% of the population were below the poverty line, including 18.5% of those under age 18 and 9.5% of those age 65 or over.

Notable people
Samuel Stalnaker (1715-1769) built the first cabin in the area in 1749.
Chris Marion of the Little River Band 
Eric McClure, a NASCAR driver;
"Nature Boy" Buddy Landel, a professional wrestler.
 Andrew "Nick" Cullop, MLB Pitcher 1913-1921.
Cody McMahan, NASCAR driver.

Climate
The climate in this area has mild differences between highs and lows, and there is adequate rainfall year-round.  According to the Köppen Climate Classification system, Chilhowie has a marine west coast climate, abbreviated "Cfb" on climate maps.

References

External links
http://www.chilhowie.org/
http://www.chilhowieapplefestival.com/

Towns in Smyth County, Virginia
Towns in Virginia
U.S. Route 11